The brown hemlock needleminer (Coleotechnites macleodi) is a moth of the family Gelechiidae. It is found in the north-eastern parts of the United States, as well as Canada.

The wingspan is 9–11 mm. The forewings are ochreous white with an oblique black streak. The hindwings are light grey. There is one generation per year.

The larvae feed on Tsuga canadensis. The larvae initially mine a series of adjacent needles and ties them loosely together with silk. In spring, the larva hollows the undersides of additional needles, which are also bound together with silk. The pupa is formed in a silken tube within the feeding web.

References

External links
Image
Larval stage info

Moths described in 1965
Coleotechnites